Felsing is a German surname. Notable people with the surname include:

Johann Conrad Felsing (1766–1819), German engraver
Jakob Felsing (1802–1883), German engraver, son of Johann
 (1831–1878), German engraver

German-language surnames